Ghatashraaddha is a 1977 Indian Kannada language film directed by Girish Kasaravalli starring Meena Kuttappa, Narayana Bhat and Ajith Kumar in lead roles. It is based on a novella by eminent Kannada writer U. R. Ananthamurthy. The film was Girish Kasaravalli's first feature film as a director, and marked not only the arrival of a promising new filmmaker but also that of Kannada cinema in the India's 'New Cinema' horizon.

The film won three awards at the 25th National Film Awards, awarded for films of 1977. It won the award for Best Feature Film, Best Music Direction (B. V. Karanth) and Best Child Artist (Ajith Kumar).

In 2002, Ghatashraddha became the only Indian film to be chosen by the National Archive of Paris among 100 others, during the centenary celebrations of cinema. At the 2009 International Film Festival of India, it was announced one of the 20 best films in Indian cinema, having received 1.6 million votes.

Plot 
Udupa (Ramaswamy Iyengar) runs a run down Vedic school, operating from his house in a village. Apart from his uncontrollable and unruly students, he lives with his young daughter, Yamuna (Meena Kuttappa), already a widow. Naani (Ajit Kumar), the innocent boy from a distant village, is a new student. A bond develops between a homesick Naani and Yamuna. Yamuna has a lover, a school teacher, whom she meets clandestinely. She is also pregnant by him. As Udupa goes out of town to raise funds for his crumbling school, things go out of hand at the school. The students go out of control and soon the entire village knows about Yamuna’s pregnancy. The traditional village members excommunicate Yamuna. Her lover gets the baby aborted without anyone’s knowledge. Udupa returns and on finding out what has happened, performs the last rites of his living daughter. Amidst all these, Naani is the only person in the village determined to support her but not for long for his father comes back to take him away. Yamuna is shaved bald and is abandoned under a banyan tree.

Cast 
 Meena Kuttappa as Yamuna
 Narayana Bhat as Shastri
 Ajith Kumar as Naani
 Ramakrishna
 Shantha
 Ramaswamy Iyengar
 Jagannath
 B. Suresha
 H. S. Parvathi

Production
Girish Kasaravalli approached U. R. Ananthamurthy for the rights of Ghatashraddha through dramatist K. V. Subbanna. Ananthamurthy, who was in the US at the time, gave his go-ahead on hearing the screenplay from Kasaravalli, on his return to India. It was on the former's suggestion that Meena Kuttappa, his former student, was signed to play the female lead in the film.

Awards 
25th National Film Awards
 Best Feature Film
 Best Music Direction — B. V. Karanth
 Best Child Artist — Ajith Kumar

1977–78 Karnataka State Film Awards
 First Best Film
 Best Story — U. R. Ananthamurthy
 Best Screenplay — Girish Kasaravalli
 Best Child Actor — Ajith Kumar

References

External links 
 
 Overview at NY Times
 ಕನ್ನಡಸಾಹಿತ್ಯ.ಕಾಮ್ ನಿಂದ ಗಿರೀಶ್ ಕಾಸರವಳ್ಳಿ ಗೌರವಾರ್ಥ - ಕನ್ನಡ ಪರ್ಯಾಯ ಸಿನಿಮಾ ರಸಗ್ರಹಣ ಶಿಬಿರ

1977 films
1970s Kannada-language films
Best Feature Film National Film Award winners
Kannada literature
Indian drama films
Films based on Indian novels
Films about widowhood in India
Films directed by Girish Kasaravalli
Films scored by B. V. Karanth
1977 directorial debut films
1977 drama films